The 2017 Qatar motorcycle Grand Prix was the first round of the 2017 MotoGP season. It was held at the Losail International Circuit in Doha on 26 March 2017. For all the three classes, the starting grid was formed by each rider's best time from any of the three free practice sessions held, after rain cancelled the planned qualifying sessions.

In the MotoGP race, Maverick Viñales won on his first outing for Yamaha, becoming the first rider to do so on début for Yamaha since his teammate Valentino Rossi did the same back in 2004.

The Moto2 class saw the début of the KTM Moto2 chassis package, following KTM's expansion into Moto2 along with MotoGP with the RC16.

Classification

MotoGP

Moto2

Moto3

 Gabriel Rodrigo suffered a broken collarbone in a crash during the opening free practice and withdrew from the event.

Championship standings after the race

MotoGP
Below are the standings for the top five riders and constructors after round one has concluded.

Riders' Championship standings

Constructors' Championship standings

 Note: Only the top five positions are included for both sets of standings.

Moto2

Moto3

Notes

References

Qatar
Motorcycle Grand Prix
Qatar motorcycle Grand Prix
Qatar